A principle is a proposition or value that is a guide for behavior or evaluation. In law, it is a rule that has to be or usually is to be followed. It can be desirably followed, or it can be an inevitable consequence of something, such as the laws observed in nature or the way that a system is constructed. The principles of such a system are understood by its users as the essential characteristics of the system, or reflecting system's designed purpose, and the effective operation or use of which would be impossible if any one of the principles was to be ignored. A system may be explicitly based on and implemented from a document of principles as was done in IBM's 360/370 Principles of Operation.

Examples of principles are, entropy in a number of fields, least action in physics, those in descriptive comprehensive and fundamental law: doctrines or assumptions forming normative rules of conduct, separation of church and state in statecraft, the central dogma of molecular biology, fairness in ethics, etc.

In common English, it is a substantive and collective term referring to rule governance, the absence of which, being "unprincipled", is considered a character defect. It may also be used to declare that a reality has diverged from some ideal or norm as when something is said to be true only "in principle" but not in fact.

As law

As moral law

A principle represents values that orient and rule the conduct of persons in a particular society. To "act on principle" is to act in accordance with one's moral ideals. Principles are absorbed in childhood through a process of socialization. There is a presumption of liberty of individuals that is restrained. Exemplary principles include First, do no harm, the golden rule and the doctrine of the mean.

As a juridic law

It represents a set of values that inspire the written norms that organize the life of a society submitting to the powers of an authority, generally the State. The law establishes a legal obligation, in a coercive way; it therefore acts as principle conditioning of the action that limits the liberty of the individuals. See, for examples, the territorial principle, homestead principle, and precautionary principle.

As scientific law
Archimedes principle, relating buoyancy to the weight of displaced water, is an early example of a law in science. Another early one developed by Malthus is the population principle, now called the Malthusian principle. Freud also wrote on principles, especially the reality principle necessary to keep the id and pleasure principle in check. Biologists use the principle of priority and principle of Binomial nomenclature for precision in naming species. There are many principles observed in physics, notably in cosmology which observes the mediocrity principle, the anthropic principle, the principle of relativity and the cosmological principle. Other well-known principles include the uncertainty principle in quantum mechanics and the pigeonhole principle and superposition principle in mathematics.

As axiom or logical fundament

Principle of sufficient reason

The principle states that every event has a rational explanation. The principle has a variety of expressions, all of which are perhaps best summarized by the following:

For every entity x, if x exists, then there is a sufficient explanation for why x exists.
For every event e, if e occurs, then there is a sufficient explanation for why e occurs.
For every proposition p, if p is true, then there is a sufficient explanation for why p is true.

However, one realizes that in every sentence there is a direct relation between the predicate and the subject. To say that "the Earth is round", corresponds to a direct relation between the subject and the predicate.

Principle of non-contradiction

According to Aristotle, “It is impossible for the same thing to belong and not to belong at the same time to the same thing and in the same respect.” For example, it is not possible that in exactly the same moment and place, it rains and does not rain.

Principle of excluded middle

The principle of the excluding third or "principium tertium exclusum" is a principle of the traditional logic formulated canonically by Leibniz as: either A is B or A isn't B. It is read the following way: either P is true, or its denial ¬P is.
It is also known as "tertium non datur" ('A third (thing) is not'). Classically it is considered to be one of the most important fundamental principles or laws of thought (along with the principles of identity, non-contradiction and sufficient reason).

See also
 Axiom
 Corollary
 Deduction
 Law (principle)
 Logical consequence
 Self-Evidence

References

External links

 
 Actus Essendi and the Habit of the First Principle in Thomas Aquinas (New York: Einsiedler Press, 2019).

 
Concepts in epistemology
Concepts in ethics
Concepts in metaphysics
Concepts in the philosophy of mind
Concepts in the philosophy of science
Metaphysics of mind
Ontology